Holger Handtke (born 1968) is a German television actor.

Filmography

Film
 (1991) - Ludwig
Enemy at the Gates (2001) - Paulus' Aide de Camp
Hart's War (2002) - Maj. Johann Wirtz
Wir (We, 2003) - Supervisor
Love in Thoughts (2004) - Wieland
Die Hitlerkantate (2005) - Regisseur
Franziska Spiegel, Eine Erinnerung (2005, Short) - Gottfried Spiegel
Baruto no Gakuen (2006) - Eduard Boese
1½ Knights: In Search of the Ravishing Princess Herzelinde (2008)
 (2010)
Tom Sawyer (2011) - Staatsanwalt
Hotel Lux (2011) - Ribbentrop
Bild von ihr (2011) - Jonathan
Two Lives (2012) - German Interrogator
Füße im Mund (2012) - Bert
The Monuments Men (2014) - Colonel Wegner
Amour fou (2014) - Arzt
Alone in Berlin (2016) - Dollfuss
The Silent Revolution (2018) - Polizeibeamter
Der Überläufer (2020) - Soldat
 Narvik (2022)

TV movies
SOKO Kitzbühel (2004-2006) - Dr. Nicolas Borowski / Norbert Schnitzler
 (2006) - Frank Schubert
Küstenwache (2006) - Michael Kortwich
La Lance de la destinée (The Spear of Destiny, 2007) - Manfred
Löwenzahn (2012-2019) - Heinz Kluthe / Horst Kluthe
And many second-roles in German TV series like Derrick, The Old Fox and others.

External links

Fitz+Skoglund Agents Berlin

1968 births
German male film actors
German male television actors
Living people
Male actors from Berlin